is a Japan-based organization for mystery writers who write honkaku (i.e. authentic, orthodox) mystery.

The organization was founded on 3 November 2000 by Yukito Ayatsuji, Natsuhiko Kyogoku, Hiroko Minagawa, Kaoru Kitamura, Tetsuya Ayukawa and other mystery writers. It is currently chaired by Rintaro Norizuki and claims about 170 members.

It presents the Honkaku Mystery Awards to writers every year and produces the annual anthology.

Honkaku mystery 
Honkaku (i.e. authentic, orthodox) mystery is one of subgenres of mystery fiction that focuses on "fair play".  Mystery novels written during the "Golden Age" of the mystery novel (e.g., the Ellery Queen novels) are regarded as examples of honkaku mystery.

Presidents 
 Alice Arisugawa (2000–2005) (:ja:有栖川有栖) 
 Kaoru Kitamura (2005–2009)
 Masaki Tsuji (2009–2013)
 Rintaro Norizuki (2013– )

Anthologies 
The HMC started producing the annual anthology in 2001.
 Honkaku Mystery 01 (Kodansha, Tokyo, 2001)
 Honkaku Mystery 02 (Kodansha, Tokyo, 2002)
 Honkaku Mystery 03 (Kodansha, Tokyo, 2003)
 Honkaku Mystery 04 (Kodansha, Tokyo, 2004)
 Honkaku Mystery 05 (Kodansha, Tokyo, 2005)
 Honkaku Mystery 06 (Kodansha, Tokyo, 2006)
 Honkaku Mystery 07 (Kodansha, Tokyo, 2007)
 Honkaku Mystery 08 (Kodansha, Tokyo, 2008)
 Honkaku Mystery 09 (Kodansha, Tokyo, 2009)
 Honkaku Mystery 10 (Kodansha, Tokyo, 2010)
 Best Honkaku Mystery 2011 (Kodansha, Tokyo, 2011)
 Best Honkaku Mystery 2012 (Kodansha, Tokyo, 2012)
 Best Honkaku Mystery 2013 (Kodansha, Tokyo, 2013)
 Best Honkaku Mystery 2014 (Kodansha, Tokyo, 2014)
 Best Honkaku Mystery 2015 (Kodansha, Tokyo, 2015)

See also 
 Honkaku Mystery Best 10
 Golden Age of Detective Fiction#Enduring influence
 Detective fiction
 Japanese detective fiction
 Whodunit
 Mystery Writers of Japan

References 
 Honkaku Mystery Writers Club of Japan (2010), Honkaku Misuteri Taisho Zen Sempyo 2001–2010 (本格ミステリ大賞全選評 2001-2010), Kobunsha, Tokyo
 Shimpo, Hirohisa (2000), "Honkaku". Nihon Misuteri Jiten (日本ミステリー事典), Shinchosha, Tokyo

External links 
 Official English page

Arts organizations based in Japan
 honkaku
 honkaku
Mystery fiction
Organizations established in 2000
Japanese writers' organizations